The 2002 Louisville Cardinals football team represented the University of Louisville in the 2002 NCAA Division I-A football season. The team, led by John L. Smith and played their home games in Papa John's Cardinal Stadium.

Schedule

Roster

Team players in the NFL

References

Louisville
Louisville Cardinals football seasons
Louisville Cardinals football